Oak Ridge or Oakridge may refer to numerous locations in English-speaking countries - the most well-known being Oak Ridge, Tennessee, due to its part in the Manhattan Project. These and other meanings include:

Places

Canada
 Oakridge, Calgary, neighbourhood in Alberta
 Oakridge, Toronto, a neighbourhood in Ontario
 Oakridge, Vancouver, a neighbourhood in British Columbia
 Oakridge Acres, a neighbourhood in London, Ontario

United Kingdom
 Oakridge, Gloucestershire, England
 Oakridge, Hampshire, England

United States

Communities
 Oak Ridge (California), in Santa Clara County
 Oak Ridge, Florida, in Orange County
 Oak Ridge, Louisiana, in Morehouse Parish
 Oakridge, Minnesota, in Winona County
 Oak Ridge, Missouri, in Cape Girardeau County
 Oak Ridge, Pemiscot County, Missouri
 Oak Ridge, New York, a hamlet south of the village of Charleston, New York
 Oak Ridge, New Jersey, in Passaic and Morris Counties
 Oak Ridge, North Carolina, a town in Guilford County
 Oak Ridge, Stokes County, North Carolina
 Oakridge, Oregon, in Lane County
 Oak Ridge, Pennsylvania (disambiguation)
 Oak Ridge, Tennessee, in Anderson and Roane counties
 Oakridge, Montgomery County, Tennessee, in Montgomery County
 Oak Ridge, Cooke County, Texas
 Oak Ridge, Kaufman County, Texas
 Oak Ridge North, Texas, in Montgomery County
 Oak Ridge, Virginia (disambiguation)
 Oak Ridge, West Virginia, in Fayette County
 Oakridge, Wisconsin, in the town of Isabelle, Pierce County

Other places
 Oak Ridge (California), a ridge in Santa Clara County
 Oakridge station, a light rail station in San Jose, California
 Oak Ridge, Adams County, Pennsylvania, part of the Gettysburg Battlefield
 Oak Ridge Historic District, a historic district in Oak Ridge, Tennessee
 Oak Ridge (Danville, Virginia), a historic plantation estate in Pittsylvania County
 Oakridge (Blackstone, Virginia), an historic home in Nottoway County

Cemeteries
 Oak Ridge Cemetery in Springfield, Illinois, U.S.
 Oakridge Cemetery, a cemetery located in Hillside, Illinois, U.S.

Education
 Oak Ridge Associated Universities, a consortium of American universities headquartered in Oak Ridge, Tennessee, U.S.
 Oak Ridge High School (disambiguation)
 Oak Ridge Institute for Science and Education, a Department of Energy institute, headquartered in Oak Ridge, Tennessee, U.S.
 Oak Ridge Military Academy, a military college-preparatory school in North Carolina, U.S.
 Oakridge School (disambiguation)
 Oakridge Secondary School, a secondary school in London, Ontario, Canada

Science
 K-25, a former uranium enrichment facility of the Manhattan Project in Oak Ridge, Tennessee, U.S.
 Oak Ridge National Laboratory, a science and technology national laboratory in Oak Ridge, Tennessee, U.S.
 ORACLE (computer), an early computer built at the laboratory
 Oak Ridge Observatory, an astronomical observatory at Harvard University

Other uses
 USS Oak Ridge (ARDM-1), a World War II U.S. naval vessel used as a floating dry dock
 The Oak Ridge Boys, a U.S. country music band
 Oak Ridge Waste, a waste management company located in the United States.

See also